The Park of Reformation is located in the southern territory of Chernivtsi, Ukraine. It was founded in the second half of the 20th century.

Topography
Its territory includes walking trails, two artificial lakes, playgrounds and fields; there is also an amusement complex. Every year the park is visited by thousands of people.

History
The park was previously named October, after the October Revolution. As a result of decommunization efforts, the very first park of reformation opened in Chernivtsi. The biggest city park was named in honor of the reformation of the 16th century, a period of time in Europe when the dark Middle Ages were ended by restoring the value of human life and freedom of speech.

Gallery

References

External links
 Official website of the Chernivtsi city Council
 World's first park of Reformation opened in city of Chernivtsi, Ukraine
 World's first 'Reformation' park of opened in Chernivtsi

2017 establishments in Ukraine
Parks in Ukraine
Protected areas established in 2017
Tourist attractions in Chernivtsi